Phebalium brevifolium is a species of small shrub that is endemic to Western Australia. It has warty branchlets, sessile, wedge-shaped leaves and up to three white flowers arranged in umbels.

Description
Flowering occurs from September to November.

Taxonomy and naming
This species was first formally described in 1970 by Paul Wilson in the journal Nuytsia from specimens collected near Queen Victoria Spring in the Great Victoria Desert by Richard Helms in 1891. Wilson gave it the name Phebalium tuberculosum subsp. brachyphyllum and published the description in the journal Nuytsia. In a later volume of Nuytsia, Wilson raised it to species status as P. brevifolium.

Distribution and habitat
Phebalium brevifolium grows on undulating sandplain and is only known from near Cundeelee and Queen Victoria Spring.

Conservation status
This phebalium is classified as "not threatened" by the Western Australian Government Department of Parks and Wildlife.

References

brevifolium
Flora of Western Australia
Plants described in 1970
Taxa named by Paul G. Wilson